Olupandu is a village situated at the southern side of northern Namibia, in the Etayi Constituency of the Omusati Region.

Olupandu features a secondary school, Onyika Junior Secondary School, and a hospital. Olupandu is home to Olupandu Elcin Church. Its neighbouring villages are Ohembe, Okamwandi and Omafa.

References

Populated places in the Omusati Region